The Ames Tribune is a newspaper published Tuesday through Sunday based in Ames, Iowa. The newspaper is owned by Gannett.

In 1986, the Tribune was bought by Michael Gartner and Gary Gerlach, two former executives at The Des Moines Register. Gartner won the 1997 Pulitzer Prize for Editorial Writing at the Tribune. The Omaha World-Herald Company bought the Ames Tribune in 1999 from Gartner, Gerlach, and the estate of David Belin. Stephens Media purchased the Tribune from the Omaha World-Herald Company in 2010. In 2015, the Stephens Media newspapers were sold to New Media Investment Group. New Media acquired Gannett Company in 2019, making the Tribune a sibling publication to The Des Moines Register.

References

External links
 
 

Newspapers published in Iowa
Ames, Iowa
1867 establishments in Iowa
Daily newspapers published in the United States
Gannett publications